The Fraud Discovery Institute was an investigative unit that sought to assist in the prosecution of perpetrators of corporate fraud. After the Institute had researched an alleged white-collar crime, it would give a report to the FBI, which could then find and arrest the criminals.

The Fraud Discovery Institute was founded by Barry Minkow in 2001 Minkow had been released from prison in 1995, where he was serving a sentence for a Ponzi scheme involving a carpet-cleaning company called ZZZZ Best. Other former convicts were also involved in the Fraud Discovery Institute; the rest of the team was composed of auditors. In September 2011, Barry Minkow was returned to prison after making false statements in the Fraud Discovery Institute's reports. Nonetheless, he managed to defraud the church at which he had been serving as pastor. In January 2014 he pleaded guilty to embezzling more than $3 million from the Church and its congregants, with incidents stretching back to 2001.

References

Business services companies established in 2001
Private detectives and investigators
American companies established in 2001